The women's 63 kg competition of the 2011 World Judo Championships was held on August 25.

Medalists

Results

Pool A

Pool B

Pool C

Pool D

Repechage

Finals

References

External links
 
 Draw

W63
World Judo Championships Women's Half Middleweight
World W63